The University of Humanistic Studies (Dutch: Universiteit voor Humanistiek (UvH)) is a university in Utrecht, The Netherlands. It is the youngest university in the Netherlands and houses about 530 students. It is also the only university offering a degree programme in humanistic studies. The UvH was founded in 1989 by elevating the status of a pre-existing higher education school of the Dutch secular association Humanistisch Verbond.

References

External links
 University website – English
 University website – Dutch

Humanist associations
Humanistic Studies
Humanistic Studies
1989 establishments in the Netherlands
Education in Utrecht (city)